The Val Morgan Group, formerly known as Val Morgan Cinema Advertisers, is an Australian advertising company first established in 1894. The company primarily specialises in cinema advertising, having worked with major Australian cinema chains including Village Cinemas, Event Cinemas, and sister company Hoyts. The company was acquired by the Hoyts Group in 2004.

Val Morgan Outdoor (VMO), operates advertising screens in shopping centres, gyms, service stations and office towers, as well as outdoor digital billboards. Val Morgan also operates the Australian versions of media websites PopSugar, Thrillist, and Fandom through Val Morgan Digital, which also owns media website The Latch.

History 
Val Morgan Pty Ltd was first established in 1894 Melbourne, Australia by Valentine Morgan, initially offering advertising opportunities for live theatre and events. The company shifted to cinema advertising in 1914 and by the 1920s, Val Morgan was in control of the advertising in over 100 cinemas in Victoria.

In 2001, Val Morgan acquired Media Entertainment Group, leaving them to be the only cinema advertising company left in the Australian market. Val Morgan was acquired in a joint venture between Hoyts, Village Cinemas, and Amalgamated Holdings in 2004, with Hoyts later increasing their stake to 100%.

Val Morgan acquired PumpTV in 2012, which had a number of screens installed in service stations across Australia, expanding the group's presence in outdoor advertising. The company also acquired local advertising agency CineAds in 2013, returning to the Western Australian market for the first time since exiting the state in 2002.

In 2019, a joint venture was formed to advertise on cinema screens in Saudi Arabia, as part of the group's expansion across the Middle East.

References 

Australian companies established in 1894
Dalian Wanda Group
Advertising industry